The Genius of Birds is a 2016 book by nature writer Jennifer Ackerman.

Content

The Genius of Birds highlights new findings and discoveries in the field of bird intelligence. The book explores birds as thinkers (contrary to the cliché "bird brain") in the context of observed behavior in the wild and brings to it the scientific findings from lab and field research.

New research suggests that some birds, such as those in the family corvidae, can rival primates and even humans in forms of intelligence. Much like humans, birds have enormous brains relative to the rest of their bodies.

Ackerman highlights the complex social structures of avian society. They are capable of abstract thinking, problem solving, recognizing faces, gift giving, sharing, grieving, and meaningful communication with humans. Ackerman goes in depth to highlight scientific studies that uncover behavior such as tool usage, speaking in regional accents, navigation and theory of mind.

Reception
The book is a New York Times Best Seller and was named one of the 10 best nonfiction books of 2016 by The Wall Street Journal.

References

Nature books
2016 non-fiction books
Animal intelligence
Penguin Press books